Peraia or Peraea (from , "land across, opposite") was used in Antiquity to refer most usually to coastal zones claimed by island states. It can also refer to:

Peraia, Pella, a village in the Pella regional unit in Greece
Peraia, Thessaloniki, a suburban city in the Thessaloniki regional unit in Greece
Rhodian Peraia, a historic area of Rhodian rule on the southwestern shores of Asia Minor
Peraea (Euboea), a town of ancient Euboea
Perea (region), a region of Ancient Israel east of the Jordan river

See also
 Galata, formerly known as Pera
 Piraeus